The 1952 Illinois gubernatorial election was held on November 4, 1952.

Incumbent Governor Adlai Stevenson II, a Democrat, ultimately did not seek a second term, instead opting to run as his party's nominee for President of the United States. Republican William Stratton was elected to succeed him in office.

Before receiving the Democratic presidential nomination at the Democratic National Convention, Stevenson had been running for reelection as governor, even winning the Democratic primary. He was replaced as Democratic nominee for Governor by Lieutenant Governor Sherwood Dixon.

Stratton was considered to have ridden the coattails of Dwight D. Eisenhower's landslide victory in the state in the presidential election. After being elected, at the age of 38, Stratton became the youngest governor in the country, and the youngest to have served as governor of Illinois in seven decades.

Election information
The primaries and general election both coincided with those for federal offices (United States President and House, and those for other state offices. The election was part of the 1952 Illinois elections.

Democratic primary

Republican primary

General election

References

Illinois gubernatorial elections
Illinois
Gubernatorial